Simone Loria (born 28 October 1976) is an Italian former footballer who played as a centre-back.

Loria is known for having scored a spectacular bicycle kick from the edge of the penalty area against Chievo while playing for Atalanta.

Career
Loria began his career at Juventus, club giant of his hometown Turin. After graduation from youth teams, he spent 5 seasons in Serie C1 and Serie C2. In mid-2002, he was signed by Cagliari of Serie B. He quickly became a regular starter and contributed to the team's promotion to Serie A in summer 2004. In his first Serie A season, he played 20 matches. At the end of season, he joined Atalanta (with Michele Canini moving in the opposite direction), a club which had just been relegated to Serie B. He won the Serie B championship with the club and played in Serie A again the following season.

Siena
In July 2007, he signed a 4-year contract with Siena for €750,000 transfer fee.

Roma
Loria completed a transfer to Roma from Siena along with his teammate Artur Moraes on 25 June 2008 in an exchange deal which saw Roma goalkeeper Gianluca Curci move to Siena in a co-ownership deal and Roma midfielder Ahmed Barusso move on loan to the Tuscan-based club. Daniele Galloppa, owned by both Roma & Siena, also became an exclusively Siena player as a part of the deal. He signed a 3-year deal and he was valued €2.8 million.

After disappointing performances, Loria was loaned to Torino which recently sold Cesare Natali on 6 July 2009. During 2010–11 Serie A Loria spent most of his time on the bench or even the stands until the classic match against Inter. Substituting Jérémy Ménez in the second half he scored the (temporary) 4–3, his second goal for Roma.

Bologna
He moved to Serie A club Bologna in July 2011. He scored his first goal for Bologna on 30 October, against Atalanta. Bologna won 3:1.

Cuneo
On 19 February 2013 Loria was signed by Lega Pro Prima Divisione club Cuneo in a -year deal. On 4 July he was released.

Honours
'''Atalanta
Serie B: 2005–06

References

External links
Profile at Football.it 

1976 births
Italian footballers
Serie A players
Serie B players
Serie C players
Juventus F.C. players
Olbia Calcio 1905 players
Calcio Lecco 1912 players
Cagliari Calcio players
Atalanta B.C. players
A.C.N. Siena 1904 players
A.S. Roma players
Torino F.C. players
Bologna F.C. 1909 players
A.C. Cuneo 1905 players
Association football defenders
Footballers from Turin
Living people